Methodology to evaluate complexity and cost of developing and maintaining application software for creating information systems (Method CETIN) - this is an algorithmic model assessment value software, developed by a consortium of Kazakh IT companies: Kazakhstan Association of IT-companies Company System Studies "Factor" and JSC "National Information Technologies. 
Method allows assessment of complexity and cost of development of [software] in the early stages and is based on an assessment of the functional size of software.

History 
The first edition of the Kazakh techniques appeared in 1994 as in "Methods of assessing complexity of information systems of the Ministry of Finance of the Republic of Kazakhstan". The principal method was based on the standardization work on a project (the creation of the queue system, the development and implementation of the project functional complex tasks, linking projects, project monitoring, the use of a PC for debugging and commissioning). The disadvantages were the methods use the principle of a cascade model of the software lifecycle and experience of a single developer.

In 2005 in NIT with Research Institute of Economy and Informatization of transport, telecommunications have developed a "methodology to assess the complexity and cost of developing and maintaining information systems." The method was based on 2005 edition of evaluating the functional size of a model of UML-diagrams of the information system, assessment of functional complexity of the size and development time estimates based on the model COCOMO. The main drawback of techniques, from whom she has not received Shirokova distribution is that technique was not adopted as a single regulatory document cost estimates for public IP razrabokti organmov. Another drawback was the lack of research on the collection of statistical databases based on IT development in Kazakhstan to confirm the partial adjustment factors.

In early 2010 and were re-work continued to refine techniques. Then at the second congress of IT-companies of Kazakhstan in the report Gabbasov M Pustovoitenko V have been identified requirements for the new version of the Methodology.

Work continued on methods companies JSC "National Information Technologies, Kazakhstan Association of IT-companies and Company System Studies "Factor". Reworked version techniques presented in August 2011 as well.

Order assessing complexity of software development 
Procedure for evaluating the development of middleware complexity represented by the following steps: 
1. Evaluation of the functional size of the developed IP; 
2. Assessment of the basic design complexity of the PES; 
3. Determining the values of correction factors labor development and maintenance of fire suppression; 
4. Calculation of complexity, taking into account the development of the PES adjustment factors; 
5. Estimation of the development of middleware; 
6. Adjustment of labor in developing middleware reduction of development; 
7. Assessment of the cost of developing the middleware.

Evaluation of the functional size of the developed IP 

Evaluation of the functional size of the IP is based on a model of information system and functional requirements of users. 
Functional size of IP given by a set of five elements, each element of which is the appropriate functional unit. 
Functional units: 
 The number of use cases - C
 Number of object types - E
 The number of properties of object types - T
 The number of interactions between types of objects - I
 The number of node types - N

Functional size is designated - SIZE = {C, E, T, I, N}

Assessment basic labor 
Basic complexity of software development is based on the evaluation of complexity of each software development process. As the development processes used by the process model Rational Unified Process. 
Basic labor Sj development process with index j is calculated as follows: 
Sj = 1 / 165 • [C * Sj (C) + E * Sj (E) + T * Sj (T) + I * Sj (I) + N * Sj (N) 
Calculation made on the basis of the regulatory complexity of factors.

Definition of values of correction factors labor development and maintenance of fire suppression 
Determining the values of correction factors for each development process is based on frequent adjustment factors characterizing the information system, the scope of its use and development process. 
Application of correction factors can improve the assessment data are available on an information system.

The calculation complexity, taking into account the development of the PES adjustment factors 
On the basis of correction factors to the complexity of developing middleware complexity calculation is done taking into account the development of the PES adjustment factors.

Assessment term software development 
Estimation of the development of an information system is on the basis of the values that are defined on the basis of a mathematical model based development time with teamwork.

Updating the development of middleware complexity by reducing the period of development 
In the case of reducing the period of development defined in the previous section uses a method of adjusting labor input software, which is determined by the elasticity of difficulty.

Valuation Software Development 
The cost of software development is calculated as the product of the complexity of software development at the flat rate of person-months by the authorized body for the planning period.

External links
 technique CETIN 
 technique CETIN 
 Paper II Congress of the IT companies of Kazakhstan 
 CETIN 
 about CETIN 

Project management techniques
Information technology in Kazakhstan